"Adieu" is a song by Canadian singer Cœur de pirate, from her second studio album Blonde (2011). It was released as a single in Canada on March 19, 2011.

Music video
The music video for "Adieu" was directed by Jérémie Saindon. The video features Cœur de pirate taking revenge on a cheating lover played by actor Niels Schneider.

Track listing
Digital download
 "Adieu" – 2:27

Personnel
Credits adapted from Blonde album liner notes.

Howard Bilerman – producer, recording 
Julien Delfaud – mixing
Béatrice Martin – vocals, producer
Marc Thériault – mastering

Charts

References

2011 singles
Cœur de pirate songs